Alekos Rantos (born on 29 October 1966) is a Greek former professional footballer who played as a goalkeeper and he is currently the goalkeeping coach of Aris.

Career
Rantos won the Greek Superleague with Olympiakos two times, on 1997 and 1998. He also played for Panelefsiniakos, PAS Giannina and Apollon Pontou. He played as a goalkeeper.

References

1966 births
Living people
Greek footballers
Super League Greece players
Olympiacos F.C. players
PAS Giannina F.C. players
Apollon Pontou FC players
Association football goalkeepers
Panelefsiniakos F.C. players
Footballers from Katerini